Erie is a city on the south shore of Lake Erie and the county seat of Erie County, Pennsylvania, United States. Erie is the fifth largest city in Pennsylvania and the largest city in Northwestern Pennsylvania with a population of 94,831 at the 2020 census. The estimated population in 2023 had decreased to 92,743. The Erie metropolitan area, equivalent to all of Erie County, consists of 266,096 residents. The Erie–Meadville combined statistical area had a population of 369,331 at the 2010 census.
 
Erie is roughly equidistant from Buffalo and Cleveland, each being about 100 miles (160 kilometers) away. Erie's manufacturing sector remains prominent in the local economy, though insurance, healthcare, higher education, technology, service industries, and tourism are emerging as significant economic drivers. As with the other Great Lakes port cities, Erie is accessible to the oceans via the Lake Ontario and St. Lawrence River network in Canada. The local climate is humid, four-seasonal and snowy but retains moderated winters thanks to the lakeside location.

The city was named for the Native American Erie people who lived in the area until the mid-17th century. It is known as the "Flagship City" because of its status as the home port of Oliver Hazard Perry's flagship Niagara. It is also known as the "Gem City" because of the lake's sparkling appearance caused by the daylight. Erie won the All-America City Award in 1972. In 2012, Erie hosted the Perry 200, a commemoration celebrating 200 years of peace between Britain, America, and Canada following the War of 1812 and Battle of Lake Erie.

History

Indigenous peoples occupied the shoreline and bluffs in this area for thousands of years, taking advantage of the rich resources. The Sommerheim Park Archaeological District in Millcreek Township west of the city, includes artifacts from the Archaic period in the Americas and the Early and Middle Woodland Period, roughly a span from 8,000 BCE to 500 CE.

Europeans first arrived as settlers in the region when the French constructed Fort Presque Isle near present-day Erie in 1753, as part of their effort to defend New France against the encroaching British colonists. The name of the fort refers to the peninsula that juts into Lake Erie, now protected as Presque Isle State Park. The French term presque-isle means peninsula (from the Latin paene and insula, both literally, "almost an island"). When the French abandoned the fort in 1760 during the French and Indian War (Seven Years' War), it was the last post they held west of Niagara. The British established a garrison at the fort at Presque Isle that same year, three years before the end of the French and Indian War.

Erie is in what was the disputed Erie Triangle, a tract of land comprising 202,187 acres in the northwest corner of Pennsylvania fronting Lake Erie that was claimed after the American Revolutionary War by the states of New York, Pennsylvania, Connecticut (as part of its Western Reserve), and Massachusetts.

18th century

The Iroquois claimed ownership first, so a conference was arranged for on January 9, 1789, wherein representatives from the Iroquois signed a deed relinquishing their ownership of the land. The price for it was $2,000 from Pennsylvania and $1,200 from the federal government. The Seneca Nation separately settled land claims against Pennsylvania in February 1791 for the sum of $800. It became a part of Pennsylvania on March 3, 1792, after Connecticut, Massachusetts, and New York relinquished their rights to the land and sold the land to Pennsylvania for 75 cents per acre or a total of $151,640.25 in continental certificates.

The General Assembly of Pennsylvania commissioned the surveying of land near Presque Isle through an act passed on April 18, 1795. Andrew Ellicott, who completed Pierre Charles L'Enfant's survey of Washington, D.C., and helped resolve the boundary between Pennsylvania and New York, arrived to begin the survey and lay out the plan for the city in June 1795. Initial settlement of the area began that year. Lt. Colonel Seth Reed and his family moved to the Erie area from Geneva, New York; they were Yankees from Uxbridge, Massachusetts. They became the first European-American settlers of Erie, at what became known as "Presque Isle".

19th century

President James Madison began the construction of a naval fleet during the War of 1812 to gain control of the Great Lakes from the British. Daniel Dobbins of Erie and Noah Brown of Boston were notable shipbuilders who led construction of four schooner−rigged gunboats and two brigs. Commodore Oliver Hazard Perry arrived from Rhode Island and led the squadron to success in the historic Battle of Lake Erie.

Erie was an important shipbuilding, fishing, and railroad hub during the mid-19th century. The city was the site where three sets of track gauges met. While the delays engendered cargo troubles for commerce and travel, they provided much-needed local jobs in Erie. When a national standardized gauge was proposed, those jobs, and the importance of the rail hub itself, were put in jeopardy. In an event known as the Erie Gauge War, the citizens of Erie, led by the mayor, set fire to bridges, ripped up track, and rioted to try to stop the standardization.

20th and 21st centuries
On August 3, 1915, the Mill Creek flooded downtown Erie. A culvert, or a tunnel, was blocked by debris, and collapsed. A four-block reservoir, caused by torrential downpours, had formed behind it. The resulting deluge destroyed 225 houses and killed 36 people. After the flood, Mayor Miles Brown Kitts had the Mill Creek directed into another, larger culvert, constructed under more than 2 miles of city, before emptying into Presque Isle Bay on the city's lower east side.
 
Downtown Erie continued to grow for most of the 20th century, based on its manufacturing base. The city attracted numerous waves of European immigrants for industrial jobs. Erie was considered a wet city during the Prohibition Era in the United States. The city's economy began to suffer in the latter part of the 20th century as industrial restructuring took place and jobs moved out of the area, as it was considered part of the Rust Belt. The importance of American manufacturing, US steel and coal production, and commercial fishing began to gradually decline, resulting in a major population downturn in the 1970s.

With the advent of the automobile age after World War II and government subsidies for highway construction, thousands of residents left Erie for suburbs such as Millcreek Township, which now has 55,000 residents.  This caused a decline in retail businesses, some of which followed to the suburbs.  Reflecting this perceived decline, Erie is occasionally referred to by residents as "The Mistake on the Lake" or "Dreary Erie".

Erie won the All-America City Award in 1972, and was a finalist in 1961, 1994, 1995, and 2009.

Geography

Erie is situated in Northwestern Pennsylvania at  (42.114507, -80.076213), on the southern shore of Lake Erie across from the Canadian province of Ontario. Erie's bedrock is Devonian shale and siltstone, overlain by glacial tills and stratified drift. Stream drainage in the city flows northward into Lake Erie, then through Lake Ontario into the St. Lawrence River, and out to the Atlantic Ocean. South of Erie is a drainage divide, beyond which most of the streams in western Pennsylvania flow south into the Allegheny or Ohio Rivers.

Presque Isle State Park (known to the locals as "The Peninsula"), juts into Lake Erie just north of the city limits and has  of public beaches, wetlands, and fishing sites.

Erie is laid out in a grid surrounding Perry Square in the downtown area. The downtown buildings are separated from the waterfront by the Bayfront Parkway. Erie has generally small ethnic neighborhoods, including a Little Italy. South of 38th Street, the grid gives way to curvilinear roads of post-1970 suburban development. Millcreek Township and upper Peach Street in Summit Township include the Erie metropolitan area's newer developments.

Most of the cityscape includes renovated and refurbished factory buildings, midrise housing, single-family homes, and office buildings. Erie's waterfront includes the Burger King Amphitheater and surrounding parkland, which hosts numerous festivals. The Bayfront Convention Center is on Sassafras Pier next to Dobbins Landing. The Bicentennial Tower is centrally located in the skyline when viewed from Presque Isle State Park, with the high-rise and midrise buildings flanking the higher ground behind and to the east and west sides. On the east end of the waterfront, the Erie Maritime Museum and the city's main library, and third-largest in Pennsylvania, host the USS Niagara. Docks and marinas fill the freshwater shoreline in between.

Climate
Under the Köppen climate classification, Erie falls within either a hot-summer humid continental climate (Dfa) if the  isotherm is used or a humid subtropical climate (Cfa) if the  isotherm is used. It is located in the snow belt that stretches from Cleveland to Syracuse and Watertown; winters are moderately cold, with heavy lake-effect snow, but also with occasional stretches of mild weather that cause accumulated snow to melt. The city experiences a full range of weather events, including snow, ice, rain, thunderstorms, and fog.

The adverse winter conditions caused USAir Flight 499 to overrun the runway at Erie International Airport on February 21, 1986, and caused whiteouts that were responsible for a 50-car pile-up on Interstate 90 on January 25, 2007.

The warmest overnight low on record was  once in 1918 and another time during the 1936 North American heat wave. On average, the warmest low of the year is a quite muggy .

On December 24 and 25, 2017, Erie received  of snowfall, breaking a record for the largest two-day snowfall anywhere in Pennsylvania. By the close of the 2017–2018 snow season, Erie had recorded  of snow, its snowiest season on record, breaking the previous record of  inches set in 2000–2001 by a large margin.

Demographics

As of the 2010 United States Census,  101,786 people, 40,913 households, and 22,915 families were residing in the city. Its 44,790 housing units averaged a vacancy rate of 8%. Erie has long been declining in population due to the departure of factories and dependent businesses. The city has lost about 40,000 people since the early 1960s, allowing Allentown to claim the position as Pennsylvania's third-largest city behind Philadelphia and Pittsburgh.

Erie's population was spread evenly among all age groups, with the median being 34. About 13% of families and 19% of the population were below the poverty line. Most of the people who reside in Erie are of European descent.

Since the 1980s, the International Institute of Erie (IIE), founded in 1919, has helped with the resettlement of refugees from Bosnia, Eritrea, Ghana, Iraq, Kosovo, Liberia, Nepal, Bhutan, Myanmar, Somalia, Sudan, Romania, Russia, Syria, and Vietnam. The inclusion of refugees in Erie's community augments religious diversity and prompts community events such as cultural festivals.

Religion
In the early 20th century, Erie had a significant Russian immigrant community, many members of which worked in the shipbuilding plants along the bayfront. Unusual for a Great Lakes city, a substantial number of these Russian immigrants were priestless (Bespopovtsy) Old Believers. In 1983, most of this community united with the Russian Orthodox Church Outside Russia, and Father Pimen Simon became an Old Ritualist priest within the canonical Eastern Orthodox Church. Even today, the gold-domed Church of the Nativity, on the bayfront near the former heart of the Russian community, is an Old Ritualist church and home parish to the famed iconographer Fr. Theodore Jurewicz.

The Erie  Jewish community  is over 150 years old. Temple Anshe Hesed, a member of the Union for Reform Judaism, is served by its spiritual leader, Rabbi Robert Morais. Congregation Brith Sholom (Jewish Center) is affiliated with the United Synagogue of Conservative Judaism, and Rabbi Leonard Lifshen has been its spiritual leader since 1989.

Its diocesan seat is Saint Peter Cathedral in Erie, which has a  central tower flanked by two  towers. Since October 1, 2012, Lawrence T. Persico has been the bishop of Erie; Donald Trautman is the bishop emeritus of the diocese.

According to the Association of Religion Data Archives, Erie County had a total population of 280,843 people in 2000, of which 103,333 claimed affiliation with the Catholic Church, 40,301 with mainline Protestant houses of worship, and 12,980 with evangelical Protestant churches.

Economy

Erie is the Commonwealth of Pennsylvania's primary access point to Lake Erie, the Great Lakes, and the Saint Lawrence Seaway. The city emerged as a maritime center after the American Revolution, then as a railroad hub during the great American westward expansion. Erie became an important city for iron and steel manufacturing during the Industrial Revolution and thrived well into the 20th century with firms such as Griswold Manufacturing, once the leader in cast-iron cookware.

Since the decline of the large manufacturers in the later 20th century, a more diverse mix of midsized industries has emerged. This broader economic base includes not only smaller and more agile steel and plastic plants (with about 10% of tooling and molding located in the tristate area), but also vigorous service sectors: health, insurance, and tourism. The zip code 16501 covering some of the downtown areas is considered one of the poorest neighborhoods in the country.

Erie is the corporate headquarters of the Erie Insurance Group and Marquette Savings Bank. Lord Corporation was founded and has major operations in Erie. Along with GE and Erie Insurance, major employers in the county include the county, state, and federal governments, as well as the Erie City School District.

Over 10% of the USA's plastics are manufactured or finished in Erie-based plastics plants. Erie is an emerging center for biofuels and environmental research, producing over 45 million U.S. gallons of biofuel a year. Tourism plays an increasingly important role in the local economy with over 4 million people visiting Presque Isle State Park and other attractions. Shoppers from Ohio, New York, and the Canadian province of Ontario frequent the Millcreek Mall and Peach Street stores and attractions as a result of Pennsylvania's tax exemption on clothing.

Both UPMC Hamot and Saint Vincent Health System are also major employers in Erie. Although both of these hospitals had been stand-alone Erie entities, Hamot merged with the University of Pittsburgh Medical Center in 2011 and Saint Vincent, which affiliated with the Cleveland Clinic in 2012, merged with Highmark's Allegheny Health Network in 2013. The United States Department of Veterans Affairs operates the Erie Veterans Affairs Medical Center on East 38th Street. The Shriners International has operated Shriners Hospital for Children in Erie since 1927.
Lake Erie College of Osteopathic Medicine (LECOM) is a fast-growing educator and provider of quality healthcare in the city.  LECOM provides stakeholders and assets to the community as part of its mission.  LECOM is located both in the city and adjacent Millcreek Township.

Arts and culture

Erie is home to several professional and amateur performing-arts groups. The most significant is the Erie Philharmonic, in continuous existence since 1913 (with the exception of an interregnum during World War II). This group of professional musicians also has a full chorus and a junior philharmonic division that tours the area. The Lake Erie Ballet is a professional company that performs well-known programs throughout the year. The Erie Civic Music Association attracts, sponsors, and books performances by professional musicians, singers, entertainers, and ensembles from around the world.

The Erie Art Museum is the city's main art gallery, located in the Old Customshouse on State Street. Its collection has an emphasis on folk art and modern art and it hosts a popular blues and jazz concert series. The Erie Art Museum also works on public art projects in an effort to revitalize and improve the city. In 2000, the Erie Art Museum created a project entitled GoFish, similar to CowParade; 95 fiberglass fish were decorated by Erie artists and placed throughout the city. Patrons paid $3,000 for a fish and the proceeds went to Gannon University's scholarship fund and the Erie Public Art endowment fund. The Erie Art Museum created a similar public art project in 2004 that involved frogs rather than fish. In 2012, the Erie Art Museum began a project to create 40 artistic and functional bike racks, designed and created by local artists. The museum's intentions are to add color and interest to downtown Erie and to promote bicycling, encourage healthy lifestyles, and provide environmental awareness.

Downtown Erie's historic and ornate Warner Theatre hosts a range of performances. Renovated in the 1980s and again in 2007, the Warner is the hub of Erie's Civic Center. The downtown area is the home of the Erie Playhouse, one of the leading community theaters in the country, and the third-oldest community theater in the U.S. Erie is also home to several other community theatres, including Dramashop, PACA, and All an Act Theatre. In addition to regular performances, Erie has many festivals including motorcycle rallies. Since 2007, the annual Roar on the Shore motorcycle rally has taken place in Erie, although in 2019, it moved to the Lake Erie Speedway.

Along West 6th Street is Millionaires Row, a collection of 19th-century Victorian mansions. The John Hill House is one of the notable residences. First Presbyterian Church of the Covenant, a well-known landmark, is also located here. The Watson-Curtze Mansion, one of the most notable residences on this street, is also home to the Erie County Historical Society. Permanent and rotating exhibits showcase the life of some of Erie's influential founders and the development of Erie.

The Erie Land Light stands at the foot of Lighthouse Street. The lighthouse was built in 1818 and replaced in 1867.

The Bicentennial Tower, on Dobbins Landing at the foot of State Street, was built in 1995−96 to celebrate the city's bicentennial. The Blasco Library and Erie Maritime Museum are its neighbors to the east. Presque Isle Downs opened on February 28, 2007, and was the fourth slots parlor in the state and the first in Western Pennsylvania. Table games opened at the casino on July 8, 2010.

Erie has been the location for many movies, including the hometown for fictional band The Wonders in That Thing You Do! featuring Tom Hanks. It is mentioned in the film Wall Street as the location of the fictional company Anacott Steel. Erie is the hometown of Train lead singer, Patrick Monahan. Erie is also the hometown of Marc Brown, the author and illustrator of Arthur books and TV series.

Libraries

There are five branches of the Erie County library system in Erie, and a bookmobile. The Main Library opened in 1996, and is the third-largest library in Pennsylvania. It is connected to the Erie Maritime Museum, and has waterfront views of the Presque Isle Bay.  The Main Library contains an art collection, and provides internet access to patrons.  The four remaining libraries are the Edinboro Branch Library, Iroquois Avenue Branch Library, Lincoln Community Center Branch Library, and Millcreek Branch Library.

Sports

Erie plays host to a number of semiprofessional and professional sports teams. The Erie SeaWolves play AA baseball in the Eastern League as an affiliate of the Detroit Tigers. The Erie Otters play hockey in the Ontario Hockey League. Hockey games are played at Erie Insurance Arena, while Minor League Baseball games are held at UPMC Park.

Gannon University, Mercyhurst University, Edinboro University, and Penn State Behrend have active NCAA collegiate sports programs. The local high schools compete in PIAA District 10 sporting events. Additionally, Cathedral Preparatory School hosts the annual high-school basketball tournament featuring top national teams, called the Burger King Classic since 2010. Scholastic and intramural sports are held at school and park facilities around the city. The Mercyhurst Ice Center,  JMC Ice Arena, Erie Sports Park, and Erie Veterans Memorial Stadium are many sports arenas and stadiums available in and around the city.

Parks and recreation

The region grows grapes and produces the third-largest amount of wine in the United States.

Downtown Erie is surrounded by Presque Isle State Park, a National Natural Landmark. The Seaway Trail runs through downtown Erie along the lakefront. The Tom Ridge Environmental Center, at the foot of Presque Isle, features  of exhibit space.

Other tourist destinations include the Bayfront Convention Center; the Bicentennial Tower that overlooks Lake Erie; Dobbins Landing, a pier in downtown Erie; the Erie Land Light, and the Erie Maritime Museum, the home port of the Niagara. The  Millcreek Mall, one of the largest shopping malls in the United States, is located on Peach Street in nearby Millcreek Township. The indoor waterpark Splash Lagoon, in Summit Township, is the largest indoor waterpark on the East Coast and third-largest in the United States. Waldameer Park, located at the base of Presque Isle, is the fourth-oldest amusement park in Pennsylvania, and the 10th-oldest in the US.

Government

The city of Erie is incorporated as a third-class city under Pennsylvania law. Incorporated under an "optional charter", the city is governed by a mayor–council government. The government consists of a mayor, treasurer, and controller, and a seven-member city council. They are elected to four-year terms, with the terms of the council designed to be overlapping. The mayor is chief executive and the city council prepares legislation and conducts oversight. The city council meets in Mario S. Bagnoni Council Chambers at City Hall. Joseph Schember (D) is the mayor of the city of Erie and was first elected in 2017. , the Erie City Council consists of:

 Michael Keys
 Ed Brzezinski
 Jasmine Flores
 Chuck Nelson
 Maurice "Mo" Troop
 Mel Witherspoon
 Susannah Faulkner

Erie is the largest city in Pennsylvania's 16th congressional district and is currently represented in Congress by Republican Mike Kelly, who was elected in 2010. Republican Dan Laughlin of the 49th District represents Erie in the Pennsylvania State Senate. The city of Erie is split by the 1st and 2nd Districts of the Pennsylvania House of Representatives and is represented by Democrats Patrick Harkins and Robert E. Merski, respectively.

Education

Erie Public Schools enroll 12,527 students in primary and secondary grades. The district has 23 public schools including elementary, middle, and high schools, with one charter school. Other than public schools, the city is home to more than 40 private schools and academies. Erie public schools are under frequent criticism for education quality, school rankings, and abnormally high teacher salary.
The City of Erie is served by two public high schools, Erie High School and Northwest Pennsylvania Collegiate Academy, plus three Catholic high schools: Cathedral Preparatory School, Mercyhurst Preparatory School, and Villa Maria Academy.

Erie is home to several colleges and universities, including Gannon University located in downtown Erie, and Mercyhurst University in the southeast part of the city. Other notable colleges in the Erie area include Penn State Erie, The Behrend College, Lake Erie College of Osteopathic Medicine (LECOM, a large medical school), and Edinboro University of Pennsylvania.

Erie is also home of the Barber National Institute and its Elizabeth Lee Black School, which provides services and education for children and adults with mental disabilities. Erie is home to its main campus, and it provides services in Philadelphia and Pittsburgh.  The Achievement Center also serves the needs of children from birth to age 21 with physical and mental health disabilities.

Community college
After years of advocacy on the issue, Erie County Council approved sponsorship of the Erie County Community College on June 28, 2017. Council Chairman Jay Breneman and colleagues Andre Horton, Kathy Fatica, and Fiore Leone voted in favor of sponsoring the community college, which was later signed by County Executive Kathy Dahlkemper. The county executive's administration took the lead in presenting the proposal to the Pennsylvania State Board of Education for approval, supported by a cross-section of business, civic, labor, and community leaders.

Media

Erie is served by Erie Times-News, the city's daily newspaper, as well as Erie Reader, an alternative weekly newspaper.

The Nielsen Company ranks Erie as 152 out of the 210 largest television markets in the United States, as of the 2019−2020 report. The market is served by stations affiliated with major American networks, including WICU-TV 12 (NBC), WJET-TV 24 (ABC), WFXP 66 (FOX), WSEE-TV 35 (CBS), and WSEE-DT2 35.2 (CW). WQLN 54 is a member station of PBS and also broadcasts in London, Ontario. Cable companies available for Erie include Charter Spectrum, DirecTV, and Dish Network.

Erie is served by several AM and FM radio stations based in the city, and dozens of other nearby station broadcasts can be heard.

In August 2019, Erie was the subject of a new television show, Undercover Billionaire, from the Discovery Channel. In this show, a wealthy businessman, Glenn Stearns, travels to Erie under a fake name, Glenn Bryant. He starts with $100, a cell phone, and an old pickup truck. He is then asked to make a business worth over $1 million in 90 days. If he fails, he has to put $1 million of his own money into the business. Stearns makes the now prosperous business of UnderDog BBQ. Although he only gets the company valuation around $750,000, it is still a successful business to date. He gave everyone who helped him big roles in the company's future and also invested the $1 million he owed.

Infrastructure

Transportation

Erie is well connected to the Interstate Highway System. Six "Erie exits" are along Interstate 90, a major cross-country thoroughfare running from Boston to Seattle.  Erie is the northern terminus of Interstate 79, which travels south to Pittsburgh and, ultimately, West Virginia. The western terminus for Interstate 86, also called the "Southern Tier Expressway", is at Interstate 90 near Harborcreek, between Erie and North East. Interstate 86 continues east through New York to Binghamton. The Bayfront Connector runs from Interstate 90 in Harborcreek to the Bayfront Parkway and downtown Erie, along the east side of the city, then connects to Interstate 79 on the west side of the city. Major thoroughfares in the city include 12th Street, 26th Street, 38th Street, and Peach Street. Peach is also a part of U.S. Route 19, whose northern terminus is in Erie and continues south, eventually reaching the Gulf of Mexico. Other major routes running through Erie are Pennsylvania Route 5, known as the Seaway Trail and is made up of parts of 6th Street, 8th Street, 12th Street, and East Lake Road in the city, U.S. Route 20, which is 26th Street in the city. The city is divided between east and west by State Street.

The Erie Metropolitan Transit Authority operates the city's transit bus system, known as the 'e'. Buses run seven days a week in the city, with trips out to other parts of the county occurring a few times a week. Intercity buses providing transportation between Buffalo, Cleveland and Pittsburgh are operated by Greyhound Lines. Service between Buffalo and Cleveland is also provided by Lakefront Lines. Both companies operate out of the Intermodal Transportation Center, which opened in 2002 at the foot of Holland Street.

The former "Water Level Route" of the New York Central Railroad travels directly through Erie. It is now the mainline for CSX freight trains. The mainline of the Norfolk Southern Railway, originally built by the Nickel Plate Railroad, also travels through Erie. At one time, Norfolk Southern trains ran down the middle of 19th Street, but were removed in 2002. Passenger rail service is provided by Amtrak's Lake Shore Limited out of Union Station at 14th and State Streets. The Lake Shore Limited stops twice daily—one eastbound towards New York City or Boston, and one westbound towards Chicago.

Destinations with nonstop flights out of Erie include Chicago O'Hare International Airport via United Airlines, Charlotte Douglas International Airport via American Airlines, and Detroit Metropolitan Wayne County Airport via Delta Air Lines (Currently suspended). Erie International is in the midst of an $80.5 million runway extension.

The Port of Erie is located on Presque Isle Bay, a natural harbor formed by Presque Isle. It offers some of the finest port facilities for cargo shipping on the Great Lakes, with direct rail access. The Erie−Western Pennsylvania Port Authority provides water taxi service in the summer between Dobbins Landing and Liberty Park in downtown Erie, and the Waterworks ferry landing on Presque Isle.

Utilities
The Erie Water Works, which was incorporated in 1865 as the Erie Water and Gas Company, includes a reservoir, two water-treatment plants, and an elaborate water works and pipe network that provides water for most of the city and suburbs. Penelec, a subsidiary of FirstEnergy, supplies electricity to the region, as well as the Northwestern Pennsylvania Rural Electric Cooperative. National Fuel Gas Company provides residents with natural gas. Time Warner Cable became the region's cable television provider, after taking over Adelphia, and also provides digital phone and high-speed internet to the region.  Local telephone and high-speed internet service is also provided by Verizon.

Sewage service in Erie is provided by the Erie Sewer Authority, and many outlying townships have partnerships with the Sewer Authority for service. The authority cleans about 30  of wastewater every day.

The time and temperature number in Erie is 452-6311 and was originally discontinued by Verizon in October 2008 before being restarted by a private individual two years later. The city of Erie and northwest Pennsylvania is located in area code 814. On December 16, 2010, the Pennsylvania Public Utility Commission (PUC) voted to split the area code, which was to take effect February 1, 2012. The North American Numbering Plan decided that northwest Pennsylvania would receive the new code of 582. A local grassroots coalition began organizing an opposition to the plan, and generated numerous petitions for reconsideration. The PUC immediately voted to review their decision and ordered additional public-input hearings and technical conferences as a response to the strong public outcry.  In January 2011, the PUC announced that it was placing the entire area code split plan on hold as NEUSTAR pushed the projected exhaustion date back two years to 2015.

Public safety

The Erie Police Department has 196 sworn personnel.

The Erie Fire Department is a full-time fire department and employs around 150 uniformed personnel. The city has five engine companies, including two rescue engines, one tower company, and one water-rescue unit. The city provides mutual aid to fire departments of Millcreek Township, Summit Township, and East County.

Sister cities
Erie has four official sister cities as designated by Sister Cities International:

 Dungarvan, Ireland (2007)
 Lublin, Poland (1999)
 Mérida, Yucatán, Mexico (1973)
 Zibo, Shandong, China (1985)

Notable people
 List of people from Erie, Pennsylvania

See also

USS Erie, at least 1 ship

References

Further reading

 Death of Brian Wells
 Evil Genius (TV series)

External links

 
 Erie Area Convention and Visitors Bureau

 
Cities in Erie County, Pennsylvania
Cities in Pennsylvania
County seats in Pennsylvania
Inland port cities and towns of Pennsylvania
Old Believer communities in the United States
Pennsylvania populated places on Lake Erie
Populated places established in 1795
Ukrainian communities in the United States